Michael Perman (died July 24, 2020) was a history professor and author in the United States. He was a professor emeritus and served as chairman of the history department at the University of Illinois at Chicago. According to his Bio, Perman received his B.A. at Oxford University and his Ph.D. at the University of Chicago. He was awarded a Guggenheim Fellowship in 1979 and 1980 and was appointed the John Adams Distinguished Professor in American History at Utrecht University in the Netherlands in 2002 and 2003.

Bibliography
Reunion Without Compromise: The South and Reconstruction, 1865–1868 (1973)
The Road to Redemption: Southern Politics, 1869–1879 (1984)
Emancipation and Reconstruction (1987)
The Coming of the American Civil War (1993), editor 
Perspectives on the American Past (1995), editor
Major Problems in the Civil War and Reconstruction (1998), editor

References

Year of birth missing
2020 deaths
American historians
University of Illinois Chicago faculty
University of Chicago alumni
Alumni of the University of Oxford
Academic staff of Utrecht University